John Herbert Roper Sr. (born August 9, 1948) is an American historian. The University of North Carolina has a collection of his papers.

He was born in South Carolina. He graduated from the University of South Carolina with a B.A., received an M.A. and a Ph.D from the University of North Carolina, and an M.S. in economics from North Carolina State University.

He is an emeritus history department chair and former Richardson Professor of American History at Emory & Henry College in Emory, Virginia. He now teaches at Coastal Carolina University. He wrote books on Southern history and several biographies, on C. Vann Woodward, Ulrich Bonnell Phillips, Paul Green, William Jennings Bryan Dorn, and Benjamin Mays.

He has written several articles for Southern Cultures.

Books
U. B. Phillips: A Southern Mind (1984)
C. Vann Woodward, Southerner (1987)
Paul Green's War Songs (1993)
C. Vann Woodward; A Southern Historian and His Critics (1997)
Paul Green, Playwright of the Real South (2003)
The Magnificent Mays: A Biography of Benjamin Elijah Mays (2012)
The Last Orator for the Millhands: William Jennings Bryan Dorn, 1916-2005 (2019)

References

20th-century American historians
Living people
1948 births
Historians from South Carolina
University of North Carolina alumni
North Carolina State University alumni
21st-century American historians
University of South Carolina alumni
Emory and Henry College faculty
Historians of the Southern United States
20th-century American biographers
Coastal Carolina University people
21st-century American biographers
American male non-fiction writers
20th-century American male writers
21st-century American male writers